Sufi (also Romanized as Şūfī, Soofi, and Şowfī) is a village in, and the capital of, Qarah Quyun-e Shomali Rural District of the Central District of Showt County, West Azerbaijan province, Iran. At the 2006 National Census, its population was 2,523 in 572 households, when it was in the former Showt District of Maku County). The following census in 2011 counted 2,507 people in 697 households, by which time the district had been separated from the county, Showt County established, and divided into two districts: the Central District and Qarah Quyun Districts. The latest census in 2016 showed a population of 2,605 people in 774 households; it was the largest village in its rural district.

References 

Showt County

Populated places in West Azerbaijan Province

Populated places in Showt County